The Somaliland shilling (abbreviation: SLS; symbol: /-, sometimes prefixed Sl.Sh.) is the official currency of the Republic of Somaliland.

Overview

The shilling has been the currency of parts of Somalia since 1921, when the East African shilling was introduced to the former British Somaliland protectorate. Following the 1960 independence and unification of the former territories of British Somaliland and Italian Somaliland, their respective currencies, the East African shilling and somalo (which were equal in value) were replaced at par in 1962 by the Somali shilling. Names used for its denominations were cent (singular: centesimo; plural: centesimi) and سنت (plural: سنتيمات), along with shilling (singular: scellino; plural: scellini) and شلن.

In September 1994, the Parliament of Somaliland endorsed President Egal’s plans to introduce a new currency to replace the Somali shilling. The Somaliland shilling was introduced on 18 October 1994 at a rate of Sl.So.1/- to So.Sh.100/-. The Somali shilling ceased to be accepted as legal tender in Somaliland on 31 January 1995.

The Somaliland shilling is pegged to the United States dollar at a rate of Sl.Sh.580/12 to US$1. Only the 100/-, 500/-, 1,000/- and 5,000/- banknotes are currently in circulation.

Coins
The Somaliland shilling is nominally divided into 100 cents, but coins denominated in cents have never been issued due to their low value. The coin with the lowest value to have been issued is the 1/- coin, first minted in 1994 at the Pobjoy Mint in England and thus bearing the PM mint mark. In 2002, 2/- and 5/- coins were issued, bearing depictions of explorer Sir Richard Burton and a cockerel, respectively. Other coins that have been issued are the 10/- coin (depicting a monkey) and 20/- coin (depicting a greyhound). Somaliland coins are not currently being minted or circulated.

The 1/- and 5/- coins are struck in aluminium, the 10/- coin in brass, the 20/- coin in stainless steel, and the 1,000/- coin in .999 fine silver.

1/- coin (1994)
This was the first coin issued by the Somaliland government. The coin depicts a Somali pigeon (Columba oliviae). The PM (Pobjoy Mint) mint mark is located near the bird's tail feathers. The words "REPUBLIC OF SOMALILAND 1994" are inscribed on the obverse of the coin; the reverse of the coin bears the words "BAANKA SOMALILAND" and "ONE SOMALILAND SHILLING" around the "1/-" in the centre.

5/- coins (2002)
There are two coins in this denomination, both issued in 2002. The first bears a portrait of Sir Richard Francis Burton, the second depicts a rooster.

The specifications of the first coin are as follows:

The obverse of the coin has the words "RICHARD F. BURTON EXPLORATION OF SOMALILAND" inscribed around Burton's portrait. The dates "1841 1904" are to the left of the portrait, and "2002" is to the right. "BAANKA SOMALILAND" and "FIVE SOMALILAND SHILLINGS" are inscribed on the reverse around the "5/-" in the centre.

The specifications of the second coin are as follows:

The obverse of this coin has the words "REPUBLIC OF SOMALILAND 2002" inscribed on it and depicts a cockerel. As with the other 5/- coin, the dates "1841 1904" are to the left of the portrait, and "2002" is to the right. 'BAANKA SOMALILAND' and 'FIVE SOMALILAND SHILLINGS' are also inscribed on the reverse around the "5/-" in the centre.

10/- coin (2002)
The Sl.Sh.10/- coin obverse depicts a monkey, around which the words "REPUBLIC OF SOMALILAND 2002" are inscribed. The reverse of the coin has "BAANKA SOMALILAND" and "TEN SOMALILAND SHILLINGS" inscribed around the "10/-" in the centre.

20/- coin (2002)
The obverse of the 20/- coin depicts a greyhound and has the words "REPUBLIC OF SOMALILAND 2002" inscribed around it. The reverse has "BAANKA SOMALILAND" and "TWENTY SOMALILAND SHILLINGS" inscribed around the "20/-" in the centre.

Banknotes
Banknotes were issued in denominations of 5/-, 10/-, 20/-, 50/-, Sl.Sh.100/-, 500/-, 1,000/- and 5,000/-; dates of issue range from 1994 to 2011. Currently, only the 100/-, 500/-, 1,000/- and 5,000/- notes are in circulation.

In 1996 and 1999, regular 50/- notes were reissued in a larger size (130 × 58 or 130 × 57 mm by difference sources).

5th Anniversary of Independence Commemorative Issue (1996)
In 1996, banknotes were overprinted with the phrase "5th Anniversary of Independence 18 May 1996 Sanad Gurada 5ee Gobanimadda 18 May 1996" in bronze/gold letters, or "Sanad Gurada 5ee Gobanimadda 18 May 1996" in silver letters to commemorate the fifth anniversary of de facto independence. However, it is unclear whether these notes were overprinted by Somaliland authorities or numismatic merchants.

Exchange rates
The central bank provides exchange services for various currencies at the official government rate, but most people prefer the unofficial rates used by hawala agents and money changers on the streets of main cities.

In November 2000, the official exchange rate of Baanka Somaliland was Sl.Sh.4,550/- for 1 US dollar. Unofficial exchange rates at the time fluctuated between Sl.Sh.4,000/- and Sl.Sh.5,000/- per dollar. In December 2008, the official rate had fallen to Sl.Sh.7,500/- per US dollar.

In December 2015, the generally recognized exchange rate was Sl.Sh.6,000/- per US dollar, and by July 2019, the generally recognized exchange rate had dropped to Sl.Sh.8,500/- per US dollar.

In December 2022, the official exchange rate of Baanka Somaliland was Sl.Sh.8530/- for 1 US dollar. The Somaliland exchange rate in 2019 was Sl.Sh.8,500/- per US dollar which is a 0.35% increase of inflation, the Somaliland Shilling remains stable around the 8,000 mark and will most likely decrease in inflation in the coming years.

See also
Economy of Somaliland
Somali shilling

References

External links
 Catalogue of Somaliland coins.

Circulating currencies
Currencies of Africa
Shilling
Currencies introduced in 1994
Currencies of Somaliland